Aethes delotypa is a species of moth of the family Tortricidae. It was described by Razowski in 1970. It is found in China (Xizang, Yunnan).

References

delotypa
Moths described in 1970
Taxa named by Józef Razowski
Moths of Asia